Olga Alekseyevna Nikitina (born 26 November 1998) is a Russian right-handed sabre fencer, 2019 team European champion, 2019 team world champion, and 2021 team Olympic champion. Nikitina was part of the gold medal winning Russian team at the 2019 World Fencing Championships held in Budapest, Hungary.

Medal Record

Olympic Games

World Championship

European Championship

Grand Prix

World Cup

References

External links

1998 births
Living people
Russian female sabre fencers
Russian female foil fencers
Fencers at the 2020 Summer Olympics
Olympic fencers of Russia
Medalists at the 2020 Summer Olympics
Olympic medalists in fencing
Olympic gold medalists for the Russian Olympic Committee athletes
Sportspeople from Lipetsk
21st-century Russian women